Changde First Middle School, or First High School of Changde, is a high school located in Changde, Hunan, People's Republic of China. The school was founded in 1902 by Xiong Xiling, who was the first Finance Minister of Republic of China. It has been a prominent high school in Hunan since its establishment, especially reputable for cultivation of revolutionaries and politicians during the turbulent years of 20th century.

History
In 1902, Xiong Xiling, a Hunan-born industrialist and reformer, founded the Western Normal College (西路師範講習所) to provide modern education for local youths in Northwestern Hunan. It was transformed to a provincial secondary school in the era of Republic of China, and renamed to Changde First Middle School after the communist takeover. The school campus used to be the manor of Zhu Yizhen (:zh:朱翊鉁), a prince in Ming Dynasty.

Notable Educators 
Xiong Xiling (熊希齡) - Founder of the school
Shen Kejia (沈克家) - Former Headmaster and teacher of English. He held a degree in English from Peking University and was fluent in several foreign languages
Yu Jiaxi (:zh:余嘉錫) - Former teacher of Chinese, Academician at Academia Sinica

Notable alumni
Sung Chiao-jen (宋教仁) - Republican revolutionary, founder and first president of Kuomintang
Jiang Yiwu (:zh:蔣翊武) - Republican revolutionary, Commander-in-Chief of Xinhai Revolution
Qin Zhen (覃振) - Republican revolutionary, former vice president of Legislative Yuan, Nationalist Government (Republic of China) 
Jian Bozan (翦伯贊) - Historian, former vice president of Peking University
Lin Boqu (林伯渠) - Communist revolutionary, former vice chairman of Standing Committee of the National People's Congress
Su Yu (粟裕) - Communist revolutionary, former commander of People's Liberation Army
Teng Daiyuan (滕代遠) - Communist revolutionary, former commander of People's Liberation Army
Li Zhuchen (:zh:李燭塵) - Chemist, former vice president of Chinese People's Political Consultative Conference
Xin Shuzhi (:zh:辛樹幟) - Agriculturalist, former president of Lanzhou University
Wu Bixia (吴碧霞) - Professor of the China Conservatory of Music

Schools in China